Nayanthara is an Indian actress, who primarily works in the South Indian film industries. She is recipient of five Filmfare Awards South. She received most of the awards for her performance in the film Sri Rama Rajyam and Aramm. She is the highest paid actress of South India. She is one of the few actresses to receive maximum awards in Tamil film industry, being a five-time Filmfare Award recipient. Nayanthara also received Nandi awards and a Kalaimamani from the state governments of Andhra Pradesh and Tamil Nadu respectively. All three are considered to be the highest honour given to any actor in South cinema. She has won a number of awards apart from these.

International Indian Film Academy Awards

Kalaimamani Awards

Ananda Vikatan Awards

Tamil Nadu State Film Awards

Mathrubhumi Film Awards

Edison Awards (Tamil)

Filmfare Awards South

Kerala Film Critics Association Awards

Nandi Awards

CineMAA Awards

Bharatamuni Film Awards

Ugadi Puraskar Awards

TSR-TV9 Film Awards

Asianet Film Awards

Santosham Film Awards

South Indian International Movie Awards

Vijay Awards

Sunfeast Tamil Music Awards

Behindwoods Gold Medal

JFW- Divas of South Awards

JFW Movie Awards

The Hindu World Of Women Awards

South Scope Style Awards

Zee Cinema Awards - Tamil

The Galatta Crown Awards

References 

Nayanthara